The Obesity Myth is a three-part Australian television documentary series, broadcast by SBS.

The documentary follows the lives of morbidly obese patients at Melbourne's Austin Health as they go through a weight loss program.

Episodes 
 Episode 1 - Battling the Biology
 Episode 2 - Eating Your Feelings
 Episode 3 - A Series of Complications

References 

2010s Australian documentary television series
Special Broadcasting Service original programming